Andrei Mihalcea (born 15 August 1987) is a Romanian handballer who plays for Steaua București and the Romania national team.

International honours 
EHF Challenge Cup:
Winner: 2015

Individual awards 
Liga Națională Best Romanian Player Award: 2016
All-Star Right Wing of the Liga Națională: 2017, 2018

References

  
1987 births
Living people
Sportspeople from Hunedoara
Romanian male handball players
CSA Steaua București (handball) players